All at Sea  is a 2011 Italian comedy film, starring Gigi Proietti. The film is intended as a sort of sequel of Sergio Citti's Casotto, which Cerami co-wrote with Citti in 1977.

Plot

The film is based on the funny bickering between two cousins Nino and Maurizio.

Cast 

Gigi Proietti: Nino 
Marco Giallini: Maurizio
Ilaria Occhini: Miss Valeria
Ninetto Davoli: Alfredo  
Ambra Angiolini: Giovanna
Claudia Zanella: Sara
Anna Bonaiuto: Adalgisa
Libero De Rienzo: Nando 
Francesco Montanari: Gigi   
Valerio Mastandrea: Fantino
Ennio Fantastichini: Suicida
Sergio Fiorentini: Nonno
Vincenzo Cerami: Gianni 
:Geroboamo
Elena Radonicich:Alina
:
: benzinaio 
Pippo Baudo: himself

See also   
 List of Italian films of 2011

References

External links

2011 films
Italian comedy films
2011 comedy films
Films with screenplays by Vincenzo Cerami
Films scored by Nicola Piovani
2010s Italian-language films
2010s Italian films